The Horowhenua-Kapiti Rugby Football Union is the governing body for rugby union in the Horowhenua and Kapiti Coast districts in the Manawatū-Whanganui and Wellington regions. The union was established in 1893 as the Horowhenua Rugby Football Union and was changed to its current name of Horowhenua-Kapiti in 1997, in order to reflect the full extent of the union's districts.

Heartland Championship
Horowhenua-Kapiti currently compete in the Heartland Championship, an annual competition organised by the New Zealand Rugby Union for New Zealand's amateur unions. The team play out of Levin Domain in Horowhenua. Previously, Horowhenua-Kapiti competed in the lower divisions of the National Provincial Championship. The union won the National Provincial Championship (NPC) Third Division in 1993. In 2018 the union won their second major honour to date, winning the 2018 Lochore Cup Final against Wairarapa Bush 26–23. 2018 was also the union's 125th anniversary, 25 years after their previous title in their centenary year in 1993.

Heartland Championship Placings
A summary of Horowhenua-Kapiti's placings in the Heartland Championship is shown below:

Ranfurly Shield History
Horowhenua-Kapiti have never held the Ranfurly Shield but had two successful challenges in 1927 when the union was amalgamated with Manawatu as Manawhenua. In 2007 Horowhenua-Kapiti recently had a challenge against North Harbour, but were outclassed throughout the match, losing 99–6. Their following matches would come in 2013 when they suffered an 85–0 loss against Waikato and in 2015 when they lost to Hawke's Bay by a margin of 50–16.

Other teams
In addition to the Heartland Championship side, the union fields a number of age-grade and women's representative teams, including a High-Performance Unit for local club and school players.

Horowhenua-Kapiti in Super Rugby
In 2013, the union purchased a three percent stake in the company which operates the team, Hurricanes' Investment Ltd, with a $100,000 contribution.

Clubs
The union currently has nine member clubs, listed below. Foxton is the oldest club in the union, having been established in 1880, however it was not a permanent affiliate of the union until 1911.

 Athletic RFC
 College Old Boys RFC
 Foxton RFC
 Levin Wanderers RFC
 Paraparaumu RFC
 Rahui RFC
 Shannon RFC
 Toa RFC
 Waikanae RFC

All Blacks
There have only been 2 players selected for the All Blacks whilst playing for Horowhenua-Kapiti: H. Jacob and J.F Karam. However, Carlos Spencer played for the union between 1992 and 1993 before moving to Auckland, and Christian Cullen played for the union in 1994 before moving to Manawatu. Dane Coles and Codie Taylor played their junior rugby in Horowhenua Kapiti making the age grade teams, while Codie Taylor also represented the Horowhenua Kapiti sevens team.

References

External links
  Official Website

New Zealand rugby union teams
New Zealand rugby union governing bodies
Levin, New Zealand
Sports organizations established in 1893
1893 establishments in New Zealand